Ponderinella is a genus of minute sea snails, marine gastropod mollusks or micromollusks in the family Elachisinidae. 

They are marine snails, only found in salt water environment. It was first discovered by Moolenbeek, R. G. and Hoenselaar, H. J. in 1995.

Species
This genus includes the following species:
 Ponderinella carlosi Rolán & Rubio, 2002
 Ponderinella difficilis Rubio & Rolán, 2018
 Ponderinella finalis Rolán & Rubio, 2002
 Ponderinella gabonensis Rolán & Rubio, 2012
 Ponderinella ghanensis (Rolán & Ryall, 2000)
 Ponderinella lignicola B.A. Marshall, 1988
 Ponderinella major Hasegawa, 1997
 Ponderinella minutissima Rolán & Rubio, 2002
 Ponderinella skeneoides Rolán & Rubio, 2002
 Ponderinella tornatica (Moolenbeek & Hoenselaar, 1995)
 Ponderinella xacriaba Absalão, 2009

References

 Rolán E. & Rubio F. 2012. A new species and range extension of Ponderinella (Gastropoda, Tornidae) in West Africa. Iberus, 30(2): 35-39

External links
 Marshall B.A. 1988. Skeneidae, Vitrinellidae and Orbitestellidae (Mollusca: Gastropoda) associated with biogenic substrata from bathyal depths off New Zealand and New South Wales. Journal of Natural History, 22(4): 949-1004
 Goto, R.; Takano, T.; Eernisse, D. J.; Kato, M.; Kano, Y. (2021). Snails riding mantis shrimps: Ectoparasites evolved from ancestors living as commensals on the host's burrow wall. Molecular Phylogenetics and Evolution. 163: 107122

Elachisinidae